Siestrzanki  is a village in the administrative district of Gmina Jedwabne, within Łomża County, Podlaskie Voivodeship, in north-eastern Poland.

Cities, towns and places near Siestrzanki include Witynie, Kucze Male-Trzcianka, Konopki Chude and Kucze Duze. The closest major cities are Sosnowiec, Bialystok, Hrodna and Torun.

References

Siestrzanki